Siorapaluk Heliport  is a heliport in Siorapaluk, a village by the shore of the Robertson Fjord, Avannaata municipality, northern Greenland. The heliport is considered a helistop, and is served by Air Greenland as part of a government contract. It is the northernmost aerodrome in Greenland with scheduled civilian flights.

Airlines and destinations 

Air Greenland operates government contract flights to villages in the Qaanaaq area. These mostly cargo flights are not featured in the timetable, although they can be pre-booked. Departure times for these flights as specified during booking are by definition approximate, with the settlement service optimized on the fly depending on local demand for a given day.

References

Airports in the Arctic
Heliports in Greenland